My Heart Is That Eternal Rose (殺手蝴蝶夢) is a 1989 Hong Kong film directed by Patrick Tam.

Cast and roles
 Kenny Bee – Rick Ma
 Joey Wong – Lap
 Tony Leung Chiu-Wai – Cheung
 Chan Wai-Man – Shen
 Cheung Tat-ming – Law Man-Shing's Son
 Gam Lui – Law Man-Shing
 Kwan Hoi-Shan – Uncle Cheung
 Gordon Liu – Lai Liu
 Ng Man-tat – Inspector Tang

Awards
Tony Leung Chiu-Wai won the Best Supporting Actor Award at the 9th Hong Kong Film Awards for his role in the film.

External links
 IMDb entry
 HK cinemagic entry

1989 films
Hong Kong crime films
Films directed by Patrick Tam (film director)
1980s Hong Kong films